Gharqab may refer to:
 Gharqab, Isfahan